The 1951 Bucknell Bison football team was an American football team that represented Bucknell University as an independent during the 1951 college football season. 

In its fifth season under head coach Harry Lawrence, the team compiled a 9–0 record. Robert R. Albert Jr. and George B. Young were the team captains.

The team played its home games at Memorial Stadium on the university campus in Lewisburg, Pennsylvania.

Schedule

References

Bucknell
Bucknell Bison football seasons
College football undefeated seasons
Bucknell Bison football